Events in the year 1605 in India.

Events
 National income - 2,269 million
 15 October –  End of the reign of the Mughal Emperor Akbar (reigned since 1556).
 16 October –  The reign of Jehangir begins (reigned till 28 October 1627).

Deaths
 15 October – Akbar, Mughal Emperor died in the age of 63 in Agra, Mughal India.

References

 
India